Hammond Academy of Science and Technology (HAST) is a charter school located in Hammond, Indiana. This school focuses on both science and technology with a heavy emphasis on a small teacher-to-student ratio. HAST is both a high school and middle school with grades ranging from 6-12.

References

External links
 Official Website

Charter schools in Indiana
2010 establishments in Indiana